Dragan Radović, commonly credited as Dragan Radovich (born July 29, 1956) is a retired Croatian-American soccer goalkeeper  who spent five seasons in the North American Soccer League.  He was also a three time first team All American goalkeeper at St. Francis College.

Youth
While born in Šibenik, Croatia, Radovich grew up in New York City where he developed his soccer skills as part of the Blau-Weiss Gottschee youth system.  He attended Jamaica High School where he was a Public Schools Athletic League Iron Horse/Pegasus Award Winner in 1975.  Radovich then attended St. Francis College, playing on the school’s soccer team from 1975 to 1978.  An outstanding collegiate goalkeeper, Radovich was the 1976, 1977 and 1978 first team All American goalkeeper.  He was inducted into the St. Francis Athletic Hall of Fame in 1987.

Professional
In 1979, The Washington Diplomats of the North American Soccer League drafted Radovich and he spent two seasons with the Dips before moving to the Portland Timbers in 1981.  He played 22 games over two outdoor seasons and 8 games during the 1981-1982 NASL Indoor season.  In 1983, he ended his NASL career with the Chicago Sting.  His career is obscure after 1983, but he continued to play, at least at a semi-professional level.  In 1989, he was on the Greek American AA team which lost the 1989 National Challenge Cup final to the Saint Petersburg Kickers.

References

External links
 Portland Timbers
 NASL Stats

1956 births
Living people
Croatian emigrants to the United States
American soccer players
Yugoslav footballers
Greek American AA players
North American Soccer League (1968–1984) players
Washington Diplomats (NASL) players
Portland Timbers (1975–1982) players
Chicago Sting (NASL) players
North American Soccer League (1968–1984) indoor players
Blau-Weiss Gottschee players
St. Francis College alumni
All-American men's college soccer players
Association football goalkeepers